Kuceraianum is a genus of ground beetles in the family Carabidae. There are at least two described species in Kuceraianum, found in India.

Species
These two species belong to the genus Kuceraianum:
 Kuceraianum azureum Morvan, 2002
 Kuceraianum kucerai Morvan, 2002

References

Platyninae